Françoise Giroud, born Lea France Gourdji  (21 September 1916 in Lausanne, Switzerland and not in Geneva  as often written – 19 January 2003 in Neuilly-sur-Seine) was a French journalist, screenwriter, writer, and politician.

Biography
Giroud was born to immigrant Sephardi Turkish Jewish parents; her father was Salih Gourdji Al Baghdadi, Director of the Agence Télégraphique Ottomane in Geneva.
She was educated at the Lycée Molière and the Collège de Groslay.  She did not graduate from university.  She married and had two children, a son (who died before her) and a daughter.

Career
Giroud's work in cinema began with director Marc Allégret as a script-girl on his 1932 version of Marcel Pagnol's Fanny.  In 1936 she worked with Jean Renoir on the set of La Grande Illusion.  She later wrote screenplays, eventually completed 30 full-length books (both fiction and non-fiction), and wrote newspaper columns.  She was the editor of Elle magazine from 1946 (shortly after it was founded) until 1953, when she and Jean-Jacques Servan-Schreiber founded the French newsmagazine L'Express.  She edited L'Express until 1971, then was its director until 1974, when she was asked to participate in the French national government.

From 1984 to 1988 Giroud was president of Action Internationale contre la Faim. From 1989 to 1991 she was president of a commission to improve cinema-ticket sales. She was a literary critic on Le Journal du Dimanche, and she contributed a weekly column to Le Nouvel Observateur from 1983 until her death.  She died at the American Hospital of Paris while being treated for a head wound incurred in a fall.

Political career
In 1974, French President Valéry Giscard d'Estaing nominated Giroud to the position of Secrétaire d'État à la Condition féminine, which she held from 16 July 1974 until 27 August 1976, when she was appointed to the position of Minister of Culture.  She remained in that position until March 1977, for a total service of 32 months, serving in the cabinets of Jacques Chirac and Raymond Barre.  She was a member of the Radical Party, and on the election documents she listed her profession as "journaliste" (or journalist in English).

Other activities
Giroud received the Légion d'honneur.  She managed ACF, a Nobel-winning charity, from 1984 to 1988.

Giroud often voiced her goal: to get France "out of its rut".  She said that Americans had the right idea; they didn't get into a rut.  On her first visit to New York City soon after World War II ended, she had been struck by "the degree of optimism, the exhilaration" she had found there. That view stayed with her: "There is a strength in the United States that we in Europe constantly tend to underestimate."

Well into her 80s, Giroud appeared on French television, in the program 100 Ans (which explores the possibility of living to be a hundred).  She appeared with face and hands bandaged from a fall just before the filming began.  She was asked to recommend the diet that would provide for longevity; she replied "chopped steak and salads".  She tried (and failed) to peel an apple with her bandaged hands; when she was unable, she burst out laughing.

Several laudatory newspaper articles about her death mentioned her sparkling sense of humor.

A special issue of L'Express covered Giroud's death.  It stated:
Women everywhere have lost something.  Ms. Giroud defended them so intelligently and so strongly.

Ms. Giroud gave the commencement address at The University of Michigan on May 1, 1976

Published works
Françoise Giroud vous présente le Tout-Paris (1953)
Nouveaux portraits (1954)
La Nouvelle vague: portraits de la jeunesse (1958)
I give you my word (1973)
La comédie du pouvoir (1977)
Ce que je crois (1978)
Le Bon Plaisir (1983)
Une Femme honorable (1981) (published in English as Marie Curie: A Life (1986))
Le Bon Plaisir (screenplay) (1984)
Dior (1987)
Alma Mahler, ou l'art d'être aimée (1988)
Leçons particulières (1990)
Marie Curie, une Femme honorable (television series)(1991)
Jenny Marx ou le femme du diable (1992)
Les Hommes et les femmes (with Bernard-Henri Lévy, 1993).
Journal d'une Parisienne (1994)
La rumeur du monde: journal, 1997 et 1998 (1999)
On ne peut pas être heureux tout le temps: récit (2000)
C'est arrivé hier: journal 1999 (2000)
Profession journaliste: conversations avec Martine de Rabaudy (2001)
Demain, déjà: journal, 2000-2003 (2003)

Filmography
 Fantômas (1946)
 Last Love (1949)

See also 
 L'Amour, Madame (1952, film)
 Julietta (1953, film)

References 
Citations

Bibliography
Françoise Giroud, une ambition française, an authorized biography by Christine Ockrent (2003)

1916 births
2003 deaths
Accidental deaths from falls
People from Lausanne
20th-century French Sephardi Jews
Radical Party (France) politicians
Union for French Democracy politicians
French women journalists
French magazine founders
French Ministers of Culture
Analysands of Jacques Lacan
French women company founders
French women screenwriters
French screenwriters
20th-century French women writers
Elle (magazine) writers
Women government ministers of France
Jewish women writers
20th-century French screenwriters
French people of Turkish-Jewish descent
Jewish women politicians